Manuel Mancini is a Sammarinese professional target shooter.

He finished 8th in 2013 World Championships. In 2015 European Games he won bronze in mixed trap shooting with Alessandra Perilli.

References

Living people
Sammarinese male sport shooters
Trap and double trap shooters
Shooters at the 2015 European Games
European Games bronze medalists for San Marino
European Games medalists in shooting
1982 births